Kabát is a hard rock band hailing from Teplice, Czech Republic.

Kabát or Kabat may also refer to:

People 
 Carl Kabat (1933–2022), American Catholic priest and anti-nuclear activist
 Dušan Kabát (born 1944), former Slovak football player
 Elvin A. Kabat (1914–2000), American biomedical scientist
 Geoffrey Kabat, American cancer epidemiologist
 Greg Kabat (1911–1994), running back in the Canadian Football League
 Jindřich Kabát (1953–2020), Czech psychologist, professor, and politician
 Jon Kabat-Zinn (born 1944), Professor of Medicine Emeritus at the University of Massachusetts Medical School
 Péter Kabát (born 1977), Hungarian football player

Places
 Kabat, Kerman, a village in Kerman Province, Iran 
 Kabat, Kermanshah, a village in Kermanshah Province, Iran 
 Kabat, South Khorasan, a village in South Khorasan Province, Iran

See also
 Kabaty, a residential neighborhood in Warsaw, Poland

Polish-language surnames
Sorbian-language surnames